The Orlando Storm is a World TeamTennis (WTT) franchise founded in 2019, owned by the league. The team was one of two expansion teams to enter the league in 2019 alongside the expansion Vegas Rollers. The Storm plays their home matches at the USTA National Campus in Lake Nona, Orlando, Florida.

Team rosters

2020 roster
 Darija Jurak
 James Ward
 Ken Skupski
 Head Coach, Jay Gooding

2019 roster
 Madison Keys
 Darija Jurak
 Evan King
 Whitney Osuigwe
 Ken Skupski
 Head Coach, Scott Lipsky

References

World TeamTennis teams
Sports clubs established in 2019
2019 establishments in Florida
Sports teams in Orlando, Florida